Historically, the Kingdom of Wolaita was ruled by more than fifty kings. The rulers used the title Kawo.
Legendarily, ~1251 is the year of Welayta's founding. (In traditional oral sources, where the state of Wolayta also existed during the Aksumite empire, or even earlier, with more than 42 dynasties. The Mala and Tigre dynasty are the most recent ones).'' The following were the rulers of the Wolayta kingdom and province in present-day southern Ethiopia.

Notes

See also
Monarchies of Ethiopia
Rulers and heads of state of Ethiopia

Walayta
Walayta
Rulers of Ethiopia
Wolayita